Ettore Marcelino Dominguez (December 20, 1898 – September 21, 1972), known as Heitor, was a Brazilian football player at the position of striker. He's Palmeiras' all time top scorer with 327 goals in 358 games.

Honours
Palmeiras
São Paulo State Championship: 1920, 1926, 1927
 National Team
Copa América: 1919, 1922

External links
Profile at Palestrinos.com.br

1898 births
1972 deaths
Footballers from São Paulo
Brazilian footballers
Sociedade Esportiva Palmeiras players
Brazil international footballers
Brazilian football referees
Association football forwards